A cave or cavern is a natural void in the ground, specifically a space large enough for a human to enter. Caves often form by the weathering of rock and often extend deep underground. The word cave can also refer to much smaller openings such as sea caves, rock shelters, and grottos, though strictly speaking a cave is exogene, meaning it is deeper than its opening is wide, and a rock shelter is endogene.

List of caves in Pakistan

References 

Pakistan
Caves
Caves